The Eskasoni Mi'kmaw Nation is a band government of the Mi'kmaq First Nations, located in Unama'ki (Cape Breton), Nova Scotia, Canada. As of 2021, Eskasoni has a membership of 4,675. Of this population, 3,973 live on-Reserve, and 667 live off-Reserve.

History

The word Eskasoni is derived from the Mi'kmaq word "We'kwistoqnik." Translated, this word means "where the fir trees are plentiful".

In 1942, the federal government enacted a centralization policy through Indian Affairs. This policy led to the forced relocation of hundreds of Mi’kmaq from to two reserves – Eskasoni and Shubenacadie, known today as Sipekne’katik. This led to rapid population growth in Eskasoni, which was previously home to less than 200 residents.

In 2016 Dr. Mohan Singh Virick, a Sikh doctor who served Eskasoni for 50 years, donated 140 hectares (335 acres) of land. He also donated several buildings in Sydney to help house Eskasoni's growing population.

Present day
Eskasoni is the most populous community of the Mi'kmaq Nation. It has its own community radio station, CICU-FM, broadcasting at 94.1 MHz. The Eskasoni First Nation is also home of the Unama'ki Institute of Natural Resources, a Mi'kmaq organization devoted to natural resources and the environment.

The community operates its own school board, providing services to children from kindergarten to grade 12.

The Eskasoni First Nation is composed of three parts:

References

External links
 Eskasoni Band Council 
 Collections Canada "Virtual Tour" of the Eskasoni First Nation community
 Eskasoni Fish & Wildlife Commission
 Government of Canada's Department of Aboriginal Affairs and Northern Development Canada Eskasoni First Nation profile
 Unama'ki Institute of Natural Resources 

First Nations governments in Atlantic Canada
First Nations in Nova Scotia
Mi'kmaq governments